Rehana may refer to:
 Rehana (actress), Indian and Pakistani film actress
 Rehana, Khyber Pakhtunkhwa, a village and union council in Pakistan
 Reyhaneh or Rehāna, a village in Abdoliyeh-ye Gharbi Rural District, Iran

Indian feminine given names